Alex Soto Hernández (July 29, 1965 – April 9, 2015) was a Puerto Rican actor, comedian and drag queen, who was well known for his transvestite characterizations. Soto was a native of San Juan, where he worked on several theatrical productions.

Biography

Soto was born in San Juan, Puerto Rico, the son of Julio Soto Cosme and Carmen Hernández Coriano. He had two sisters, Magali and Ivette, and a brother, Denis. Since a very young age, he found work as an actor in Puerto Rican theatre, and during the 2000s, he gained popular exposure on the famed television show, Minga y Petraca, playing "Tomasa", a neighborhood lady.

In 2002, Soto portrayed a drag queen in a theater play named Vidas de Herejes, which was a hit play. He reprised the role when the play returned to the theaters during 2004 and 2010.

Health problems
Soto suffered from diabetes and obesity. In 2012, he had his right leg amputated. He flew from Puerto Rico to Boston, Massachusetts in late 2014, both to be near his sister and to be hospitalized there for diabetes and for an infection on his amputated leg.

Soto suffered a fatal heart attack at the hospital in Springfield, Massachusetts on the evening of April 9, 2015.

See also
Antonio Pantojas
Dreuxilla Divine
Lady Catiria
List of Puerto Ricans

External links

1965 births
2015 deaths
Puerto Rican LGBT entertainers
Puerto Rican male stage actors
Puerto Rican male television actors
Puerto Rican LGBT actors
Puerto Rican comedians
21st-century Puerto Rican male actors
Male actors from San Juan, Puerto Rico
21st-century American comedians
People with diabetes
21st-century LGBT people